The following is a list of all the squads of the national teams that competed at the 2013 FIFA U-20 World Cup. Each squad consisted of 21 players in total, three of whom had to be goalkeepers.

Players whose names are marked in bold have been capped at full international level.

Group A

Head coach: Pierre Mankowski

Head coach: Sellas Tetteh

Head coach: Tab Ramos

Head coach: Julen Lopetegui

1. Rubén Yáñez was called up before the tournament began to replace Kepa Arrizabalaga, who pulled out through injury.

Group B

Head coach: Raúl González

Head coach: Lee Kwang-Jong

Head coach: John Obuh

Head coach: Edgar Borges

1. Ivan Cavaleiro was called up before the tournament began due to an injury to Gonçalo Paciência.

Group C

Head coach: Carlos Alberto Restrepo

Head coach: Feyyaz Uçar

Head coach: Mauricio Alfaro

Head coach: Paul Okon

1. Hagi Gligor was called up before the tournament began due to an injury to Terry Antonis.

Group D

Head coach: Sergio Almaguer

Head coach: Kostas Tsanas

*

Dimitris Pelkas replaced Taxiarchis Fountas due to injury.

Head coach: Victor Genes

Head coach: Moussa Keita

Group E

Head coach: Mario Salas

1. Óscar Hernández was called up before the tournament began due to an injury to Ignacio Caroca.
2. Diego Valdés was called up before the tournament began due to an injury to Diego Rojas.

Head coach: Rabie Yassin

Head coach: Peter Taylor

Head coach: Hakeem Shaker

1. Fahad Talib replaced Saqr Ajeel due to injury.

Group F

Head coach: Chris Milicich

Head coach: Akhmadjan Musaev

Head coach: Juan Verzeri

Head coach: Dinko Jeličić

Player statistics
Player representation by club

Player representation by league

The Iraq, Uzbekistan and Cuba squads were made up entirely of players from the respective countries' domestic leagues.

References

External links
Official Squad list at FIFA.com
Official site  at FIFA.com

FIFA U-20 World Cup squads
2013 FIFA U-20 World Cup